The St. Petersburg State Academic Capella (also: Glinka State Academic Capella), is the oldest active Russian professional musical institution with a history dating back to 1479. It is based in the city of Saint Petersburg. It has had various names over the years, including "St. Peterburg Court Chapel" and the "Glinka State Choir of St. Petersburg".

The institution currently consists of a choir, an orchestra, and has its own concert hall. It also had an educational music college at one point, which is currently independent of the Court Capella.

In 2000, the Saint Petersburg State Academic Capella was awarded the Liliane Bettencourt Choral Singing Prize in partnership with the Académie des beaux-arts. This award honours the Capella's quality musical output in keeping with Russia's choral tradition.

References

Sources 
 Carolyn C. Dunlop. The Russian Court Chapel Choir 1796-1917. Routledge, 2013.  
 Jopi Harri. St. Petersburg Court Chant and the Tradition of Eastern Slavic Church Singing. Finland, University of Turku, 2011.

External links 
 Official page of the Capella

Musical groups established in the 15th century
Contemporary classical music ensembles
National choirs
Russian choirs
Russian symphony orchestras
Music schools in Russia
1479 establishments in Europe
15th-century establishments in Russia
Cultural heritage monuments of federal significance in Saint Petersburg